Troels Rønning Vinther (born 24 February 1987) is a Danish former professional road bicycle racer, who rode professionally between 2006 and 2019 for the , Team Capinordic,  (over three spells) and  teams.

Major results 

2005
 1st  Road race, National Junior Road Championships
 1st Overall Liège–La Gleize
1st  Mountains classification
 7th Paris–Roubaix Juniors
2006
 3rd Road race, National Road Championships
2008
 7th Nationale Sluitingsprijs
2009
 1st Stage 4 Tour de l'Avenir
 1st  Mountains classification Danmark Rundt
 2nd Road race, National Under-23 Road Championships
 3rd Grand Prix Cristal Energie
2010
 4th Overall Festningsrittet
1st Stages 1 & 3
 5th Overall Kreiz Breizh Elites
 7th Overall Tour of China
2011
 1st GP Herning
 1st Stage 1 Circuit des Ardennes
 4th Grote Prijs Stad Zottegem
 6th Overall Flèche du Sud
 10th Grand Prix de la Ville de Lillers
2013
 4th Destination Thy
 5th GP Herning
 10th Overall Danmark Rundt
2014
 1st Stage 2 Circuit des Ardennes
 2nd Ster van Zwolle
 2nd Destination Thy
 3rd Overall Tour du Loir-et-Cher
1st Stage 2
 9th Overall Danmark Rundt
2017
 2nd Overall Tour du Loir-et-Cher
 2nd Skive–Løbet
 3rd Ringerike GP
 4th Overall An Post Rás
2018
 4th Ringerike GP

References

External links 

1987 births
Living people
Danish male cyclists
People from Silkeborg
Sportspeople from the Central Denmark Region